Krag's first cabinet was the government of Denmark from 3 September 1962 to 26 September 1964, headed by Jens Otto Krag as prime minister, and succeeded Kampmann's second cabinet when he stepped down due to poor health. The cabinet consisted of the Social Democrats and Social Liberal Party.

Composition 

|}

References 

 Government of Denmark
 Cabinets of Denmark
 1962 establishments in Denmark
 Cabinets established in 1962
 Cabinets disestablished in 1964
 1964 disestablishments